California's county jails function like county jails throughout the United States: they are used to incarcerate people pre-trial, through a trial and sentencing, and for some sentences of commitment. The majority of people incarcerated in California's county jails have not been sentenced (they are pre-trial and have not been convicted of a crime).

Historically, time would be served in a county jail for sentences of less than a year, including sentences for misdemeanors and some felonies. In 2011, the Public Safety Realignment Act was signed into law in response to the Supreme Court case Brown v. Plata and the resulting court order to address prison overcrowding in the state. Realignment "shifted responsibility for all sentenced non-violent, non-serious, non-sex offenders from state to local jurisdictions", which decreased California prison populations, increased California county jail populations, and changed the types and distribution of crimes for which people were serving sentences in county jails.

For comparison, in December 2019 there were approximately 71,200 people incarcerated in California county jails (based on average daily population), 124,027 people incarcerated in California state prisons, and 51,923 people on parole in California.

California county jails

Rated capacity and average daily population reports from the California Board of State and Community Corrections were used to determine what constitutes a distinct jail facility for this list.

The following counties do not have jails:

 Alpine County: jail services are contracted to El Dorado County and Calaveras County.
 Sierra County: this county does not have an official jail tracked by the Board of State and Community Corrections, but the Sheriff's website says that "as of March 17, 2015 the Sierra County Jail began operating as a Temporary Housing Facility".

See also
 Incarceration in California

References

Jails
Jails in California
Jails